Christine Renee Drazan ( Deboy; born May 28, 1972) is an American politician who served in the Oregon House of Representatives from the 39th district from 2019 to 2022, as a member of the Republican Party. During her tenure in the state house she served as the minority leader from 2019 to 2021. She was the Republican nominee in the 2022 Oregon gubernatorial election, which she lost to Democrat Tina Kotek.

Drazan was born in Klamath Falls, Oregon, and educated at Eagle Point High School and George Fox University. During the 1990s she worked for Speaker Mark Simmons. She was elected to the state house in the 2018 election and reelected in the 2020 election. During her tenure as minority leader, she engaged in dilatory and quorum denial tactics in an attempt to thwart legislation sponsored by Democrats.

Early life and education

Christine Renee Deboy was born to Perrliee and Dale E. Deboy in Klamath Falls, Oregon. She graduated from Eagle Point High School and George Fox University. She worked as the director of communications for Mark Simmons, the Speaker of the Oregon House of Representatives, in the 1990s. She married Daniel Joseph Drazan on May 17, 1997, with whom she has three children.

Career

Oregon House of Representatives

Elections

Bill Kennemer, a member of the state house from the 39th district retired during the 2018 election. Drazan defeated John Lee, Seth Rydmark, and Ken Kraft for the Republican nomination and defeated Democratic nominee Elizabeth Graser-Lindsey in the general election. She defeated Democratic nominee Tessah Danel and Libertarian nominee Kenny Sernach in the 2020 election.

Tenure

During Drazan's tenure in the state house she served on the Judiciary committee. Drazan was selected to replace Carl Wilson as the Minority Leader on September 16, 2019, and served until she was replaced by Vikki Breese-Iverson on November 30, 2021.

During her time as Minority Leader the Republicans refused to attend legislative meetings in order to deny a quorum so that legislation could not be passed. Drazan participated in these quorum denials and left the state. She also forced the readings of the entirety of legislation as a delaying tactic. She was appointed to the six-member committee to redraw the districts following the 2020 United States census with equal representation from the Democratic and Republican parties as a compromise created to have the Republicans stop using delaying tactics against legislation. Speaker Tina Kotek later reversed her decision and restored the Democratic majority on the committee redrawing the congressional districts. She made a motion for Kotek to be censured due to this, but it failed with thirty-three representatives voting against and fourteen voting in favor.

Gubernatorial campaign

One of Drazan's aides stated on November 23, 2021, that she was going to run for the Republican nomination in the 2022 gubernatorial election. She announced her campaign on January 4, 2022, and resigned from the state house on January 31, where her seat was filled by James Hieb. Trey Rosser was her campaign manager. She won in the Republican primary against eighteen other candidates with 23% of the vote. During 2022 her campaign raised $2,101,788.27 and spent $2,542,604.18. She lost the election to former Speaker of the Oregon House of Representatives Tina Kotek.

Political positions

Drazan opposed emissions trading legislation in 2020, and demanded a referendum on the legislation. She supports the usage of an independent redistricting commission for redrawing districts. She opposed a COVID-19 vaccination mandate. Drazan opposes allowing transgender athletes to participate in gender-specific sporting events. Drazan does not support Donald Trump's claims of having won the 2020 presidential election and stated that "Donald Trump did not win. Joe Biden did. He is our president".

Drazan received a lifetime score of 20% from the Oregon League of Conservation Voters. She was endorsed by Oregon Right to Life during the 2022 election. She opposes Measure 114 and received an A rating from the NRA.

Electoral history

References

External links
 Campaign website
 Legislative website
 

|-

|-

1972 births
21st-century American politicians
21st-century American women politicians
Living people
George Fox University alumni
Republican Party members of the Oregon House of Representatives
Politicians from Canby, Oregon
Women state legislators in Oregon